Alexander Yurasovsky (June 15, 1890 – January 31, 1922) was a  conductor and composer active in the Russian Empire and later in the Soviet Union.

Biography 
Yurasovsky was born in the town of Mishkovo located within the Oryol district. He was the grandson of violinist Vasiliǐ Zhakharovich (1842-1907) and son of the opera singer Nadezhda Vasil'evna Salina (1864-1955). He studied piano with E.P. Savina and musical composition with Peter Nikolaevich Renchitsky, Reinhold Glière and Alexander Gretchaninov, graduating from  Moscow University in 1913 with a degree in law. 
He made his conducting debut in 1912. After time in the Russian Army from 1914 to 1917, he resumed his musical activity, conducting concerts in Kharkiv, Odessa, and Rostov-on-Don.

He held administrative and conducting positions, and orchestrated Sergei Rachmaninoff's Suite No. 2 as well as Suite of Preludes (containing preludes Op. 23, No 3, 4, 10, and Op. 32, No 12, 13).

List of works 
Opera
Trilby (libretto by composer from the novel by George du Maurier)

Orchestra works
In the Moonlight, op. 6 (1911) 
Pastel (2 Pictures, 1911)
Ghosts, symphonic poem, op. 8 (1912)
Spring Symphony (1918)
Poem-concerto for piano and orchestra (1918)
Suite (1922)

Chamber music
Dramatic sonata cello and piano. (1911)
Piano Trio (1911)

Piano music
4 Preludes (1910)
Sonata dramatique, op. 3 (1910)
6 The way of love songs (lyrics by A. Allyn, 1912)
3 songs (lyrics by Nekrasov, 1913),
14 recitations to music
music for productions of dramas, including "The Prince and the manor" (1914)
6 improvisations (1915) 3 ensembles for women 's voices with AF. (1913) for voice and piano

References

External links 
 
 

1890 births
1922 deaths
Musicians from the Russian Empire
Moscow State University alumni
Male opera composers
Soviet musicians